Atlanta Metropolitan State College is a public college in Atlanta, Georgia. It is part of the University System of Georgia.

History 
In June 1965, the University System of Georgia authorized the creation of a junior college in the Atlanta metropolitan area. A location was selected adjacent to the Atlanta Area Technical School and construction began in 1973, finishing the subsequent year. The construction cost an estimated $2 million. Classes began in September 1974 with an initial enrollment of 504 students.

The institution was originally known as Atlanta Junior College. The name was changed in 1988 to Atlanta Metropolitan College. For several decades after its establishment, the institution was the only predominantly African-American two-year institution in the state. In 2012, the institution began offering four-year degree programs. In the same year, the institution adopted its current name in recognition of its new status as state college

References

External links
 Official website

 

Public universities and colleges in Georgia (U.S. state)
Universities and colleges accredited by the Southern Association of Colleges and Schools
Educational institutions established in 1974
Universities and colleges in Atlanta
NJCAA athletics
University System of Georgia